Reprisal is a 2018 American action thriller film directed by Brian A. Miller and written by Bryce Hammons. The film stars Bruce Willis, Frank Grillo, Johnathon Schaech, and Olivia Culpo.

Synopsis
Jacob is a bank manager with a wife, Christina, and daughter, Sophia.  They are struggling financially due to Sophia's aggressive Type I Diabetes.  A robber infiltrates Jacob's bank, killing a guard and forcing Jacob to open the vault, using him and another employee as a decoy while he makes his escape.  Discussing the robbery with his neighbor, James, a retired cop, they analyze the robbery and other jobs the robber has committed, identifying various signature traits.  Using this knowledge, Jacob identifies the robber as Gabriel and that his next target is an armored car.  During the robbery, Gabriel kills a guard and injures Maribel, the other guard, who knows Jacob from the bank.  Jacob is able to observe where Gabriel hid the money from the armored car and takes it.  When he finds the money missing, Gabriel tracks Maribel to the hospital and, at gunpoint, forces her to call Jacob, telling him to come to the hospital.  Gabriel then shoots Maribel before making his way to Jacob's house, where he kidnaps Christina and Sophia.  With James' help, Jacob is able to coordinate the drop-off of the money and the rescue of his family.  Gabriel kills several police officers in a shootout before finally being killed by James.  Six months later, Jacob has joined the police force as a rookie, following in the footsteps of his father.

Cast
 Bruce Willis as James
 Frank Grillo as Jacob
 Johnathon Schaech as Gabriel
 Olivia Culpo as Christina, Jacob's wife
 Colin Egglesfield as FBI Agent Fields
 Christopher Rob Bowen as Detective Roberts
 Jesse Pruett as Hospital Administrator
 Tyler Jon Olson as Casey
 Wass Stevens as Fredericks
 Sergio Rizzuto as Michael
 Natali Yura as Maribel
 Jason Marcus Griffith as Businessman
 William Cross as Businessman
 Brian D. Wolfe as Parademic #1
 James Kalub as Businessman

Production
The project was announced on February 21, 2017, and that Emmett/Furla/Oasis Films had set Bruce Willis to star in the action thriller film, which would be directed by Brian A. Miller and produced by Randall Emmett and George Furla. On June 2, 2017, Olivia Culpo was cast in the film.

Principal photography on the film began on August 7, 2017, in Cincinnati, Ohio.

The film was shot in 14 days, of which Bruce Willis was on set for 1 day.

Reception
As of August 11, 2022, Reprisal grossed $598,625 in the United Arab Emirates, Portugal, Turkey, and South Korea, and grossed $1,125,422 in home video sales. The film was poorly received by film critics. On Metacritic, the film has a weighted average score of 19 out of 100, based on 9 critics, indicating "overwhelming dislike".

References

External links
 
 

2018 films
2018 independent films
American action thriller films
2018 action thriller films
MoviePass Films films
Films shot in Ohio
Films set in Cincinnati
2010s English-language films
Films directed by Brian A. Miller
2010s American films